The East Tennessee State Buccaneers men's soccer team is a varsity intercollegiate athletic team of East Tennessee State University in Johnson City, Tennessee, United States. The team is a member of the Southern Conference, which is part of the National Collegiate Athletic Association's Division I. ETSU's first men's soccer team was fielded in 2008. The team plays its home games at Summers-Taylor Stadium on the ETSU campus. The Buccaneers were coached by Bo Oshoniyi until he was hired away by Dartmouth College. In March 2018, ETSU announced the hiring of former University of Kentucky assistant coach David Casper. Following his dismissal in 2021, David Lilly assumed the post of head coach.

History 

East Tennessee State's varsity soccer program began in 2008, when the Buccaneers began play in the Atlantic Sun Conference. Since the Bucs had already been an established Division I school in other sports and a full-member of the Atlantic Sun Conference, the new program was immediately eligible for postseason play, namely the Atlantic Sun Men's Soccer Tournament and the NCAA Division I Men's Soccer Championship.

During the 2008 campaign, the Buccaneers fared well in non-conference play, achieving a record of 5–3 record; however, the Bucs finished towards the bottom of the A-Sun table, with a 1–7–1 conference record. It was not until 2010 that ETSU achieved a winning record, where the Bucs finished the season 15–6 overall and with a 7–2 conference record. Led by future professional Aaron Schoenfeld, the Bucs won both the Atlantic Sun regular season and the conference tournament, earning their first NCAA berth two years after the beginning of the program. The Bucs lost their first NCAA tournament match, 3–2, to the College of Charleston Cougars. The Bucs returned to the NCAAs in 2013 and 2016.

Current squad

Updated March 30, 2022

Seasons

NCAA tournament results 

ETSU has appeared in three NCAA tournaments.

Notable players
 Aaron Schoenfeld (born 1990) - former professional soccer player
 Cameron Woodfin (born 1996) - semi-professional soccer player
 Nick Spielman (born 1996) - professional soccer player

References

External links 
 

2008 establishments in Tennessee
Association football clubs established in 2008